Sutcliffe or Sutcliff is a surname, originating in three locations in Yorkshire, sometimes spelled Sutliffe or, unusually, Sutliff. The name means south of the cliff/hill.

People bearing the name include:
 Alistair Sutcliffe (born 1951), British professor of systems engineering
 Andy Sutcliffe (1947–2015), British racing driver
 Bert Sutcliffe (1923–2001), New Zealand cricketer
 Charles Sutcliffe (1864–1939), British lawyer, football administrator and referee
 David Sutcliffe (born 1969), Canadian actor
 Francis Meadow Sutcliffe (1853–1941), English photographer
 Gerry Sutcliffe (born 1953), British politician
 George Sutcliffe (1878–1943), co-founder of Sangorski & Sutcliffe, a British bookbinder
 Herbert Sutcliffe (1894–1978), English cricket player
 Herbert Sutcliffe (alternative health advocate) (1886–1971), English psychologist and advocate of pseudoscientific alternative health
 Ken Sutcliffe (born 1947), Australian sporting journalist
 Iain Sutcliffe (born 1974), English cricketer
 John Sutcliffe (disambiguation)
 Lenah Higbee (1874–1941), née Sutcliffe, Canadian-born American pioneering military nurse, first woman awarded the Navy Cross
 Matthew Sutcliffe (1550?–1629), English clergyman, academic and lawyer, chaplain and advisor to King James I of England
 Michael Sutcliffe, South African municipal manager
 Michelle Sutcliffe (born 1967), English boxer and martial artist
 Paul Sutcliffe, English mathematical physicist and mathematician
 Peter Sutcliffe (disambiguation)
 Rick Sutcliffe (born 1956), American former Major League Baseball pitcher
 Rosemary Sutcliff (1920–1992), English novelist, primarily but not exclusively for children
 Serena Sutcliffe (born 1945), wine critic
 Shane Sutcliffe (born 1975), Canadian former boxer
 Stuart Sutcliffe (1940–1962), Scottish painter and musician, an early member of The Beatles
 Tom or Thomas Sutcliffe (disambiguation)
 William Sutcliffe (born 1971), British novelist

References

English-language surnames